is a Prefectural Natural Park in southwest Hyōgo Prefecture, Japan. Established in 1959, the park spans the municipalities of Aioi, Himeji, and Tatsuno.

See also
 National Parks of Japan

References

Parks and gardens in Hyōgo Prefecture
Protected areas established in 1959
1959 establishments in Japan